George Bullard may refer to:

 George Bullard (baseball) (1928–2002), American baseball player
 George Purdy Bullard (1869–1924), American lawyer and Democratic Party politician